FRG2B (FSHD Region Gene 2 Family Member B) is a human gene located on chromosome 10 (cytoband 10q26.3). Its function is unknown.

References

Genes on human chromosome 10